Homer is a town in and the parish seat of Claiborne Parish in northern Louisiana, United States. Named for the Greek poet Homer, the town was laid out around the Courthouse Square in 1850 by Frank Vaughn. The present-day brick courthouse, built in the Greek Revival style of architecture, is one of only four pre-Civil War courthouses in Louisiana still in use. The building, completed in 1860, was accepted by the Claiborne Parish Police Jury on July 20, 1861, at a cost of $12,304.36, and is on the National Register of Historic Places. The other courthouses are in St. Francisville, St. Martinville and Thibodaux.

The population of Homer was 2,747 in 2020.

History
 Johnson donated land for the former Ashland High School. Johnson is interred in Coushatta in Red River Parish.

The Herbert S. Ford Memorial Museum operates across from the parish courthouse in the former Claiborne Hotel (completed 1890). The museum claims the oldest compressed bale of cotton in existence in the United States. This cotton display is believed to have been baled about 1930. Adjacent to the cotton exhibit is the "Black Gold", a replica of an oilfield roughneck—a general laborer worker who loading and unloads cargo from crane baskets and keeps the drilling equipment clean—employed in the early 1930s by the Sinclair Oil and Gas Company. The exhibit has a recording which explains how a farm family, growing mostly cotton and corn faced great economic travail in Mississippi but relocated to Claiborne Parish to take advantage of the oil and natural gas boom. "Oil changed our lives forever. We owe a lot to the men, mud, and mules that made it happen," concludes the recorded message. In 1921, oil was discovered in Homer; in 1921, another strike followed in Haynesville in northern Claiborne Parish. The boom continued through the 1930s and brought many customers to the then booming Hotel Claiborne, which had been established in 1890 and declared a state historic site in 1984.

Former Homer Mayor Alecia Smith was sentenced in 2017 after she pleaded guilty to two counts of malfeasance in office. She diverted Homer municipal funds to personal use and falsified public records. Her two five-year sentences were deferred, and she was instead placed on probation. She must pay a $1,000 fine and repay more than $6,000 to the municipality. Louisiana Attorney General Jeff Landry said that department will "not stand for corrupt public officials. ... The people of our state deserve better and should expect more out of those who are appointed or elected to serve."

The Homer of nostalgia
 

Rex's Barber Shop was a staple of downtown Homer, Louisiana for more than 60 years, until the owners retirement in 2018. From 1957 to 2018, Rex's Barber Shop was owned and operated by local Homer resident Rex Young, a native of nearby Athens, Louisiana. The shop, located on the north side of the downtown Homer square, served as a community gathering place for many younger and older citizens of the area. As with most small town businesses, this barber shop was a lively place for area residents to get the news, discuss local politics and of course, learn the latest football scores involving the area high schools. Many young boys got their first haircut at Rex's Barber Shop, and later watched their own children, their grandchildren and—in some cases—even their great grandchildren do the same.

Author Marilyn Sewell, a Unitarian Universalist minister in Portland, Oregon, was reared in Homer.

Geography
Homer is located at  (32.789863, -93.058633).

Demographics

As of the 2020 United States census, there were 2,747 people, 1,268 households, and 777 families residing in the town.

Culture and economy

Notable people 
 James Andrews, world-renowned sports physician and orthopedic surgeon
 William Jasper Blackburn, mayor of Minden from 1855 to 1856, U.S. Representative from Louisiana's 4th congressional district from 1868 to 1869, member of Louisiana State Senate from 1874 to 1878
 Cheryl Ford, only woman to win the WNBA Rookie of the Year Award and a WNBA championship in the same year
 Milton Joseph Cunningham, attorney, state legislator from Natchitoches parish, state attorney general for three nonconsecutive terms ending in 1900, reared in Homer prior to 1858
 Bettye Davis, Alaska state representative, social worker, and nurse
 T. H. Harris, state superintendent of education (1908–1940), educated at the former Homer College in the late 19th century
 Gary Lee Jones, member of the Louisiana Board of Elementary and Secondary Education, effective January 2016; Claiborne Parish school superintendent in Homer from 1999 to 2003
 Joe LeSage, Shreveport attorney, former state senator from Caddo Parish, former Louisiana State University supervisor, graduated from Homer High School in 1945
 Paul Lowe, member of the American Football League All-Time Team
 Max T. Malone, former state senator from Caddo and Bossier parishes, graduated from Homer High School in 1971
 James T. McCalman, state senator from Claiborne and Bienville parishes from 1960 to 1964; Homer businessman
 Danny Roy Moore, state senator from Claiborne and Bienville parishes from 1964 to 1968, graduated from Homer High School
 John Sparks Patton, educator from Claiborne Parish who first advocated taxpayer-funded school textbooks; former member of the Louisiana Public Service Commission
 William M. Rainach, notorious sergregationalist member of both houses of the state legislature; gubernatorial candidate in 1959, founder of near-by Claiborne Academy
 Bobby Rush, Grammy Award-winning blues musician, composer and singer
 Larry Sale, sheriff of Claiborne Parish from 1936 to 1944, bodyguard of Huey Pierce Long, Jr., decorated soldier of World War I, interred at Arlington Cemetery in Homer
 Gaynell Tinsley, consensus All-American football player at LSU, 1935–1935, and All-Pro with the Chicago Cardinals, 1937–1938
 David Wade, Lieutenant General of the United States Air Force, former commander of Barksdale Air Force Base, state corrections director and adjutant general, was reared in the Holly Springs Community of Claiborne Parish but considered Homer as his hometown.
 Von Wafer, professional basketball player
 Loy F. Weaver, retired banker and businessman; former member of the Louisiana House of Representatives (1976–1984) and candidate for the United States House of Representatives (1978)

Government and infrastructure
The United States Postal Service operates the Homer Post Office.

Louisiana Department of Public Safety and Corrections operates the David Wade Correctional Center in an unincorporated section of Claiborne Parish near Homer.

Zip Code:  71040

Education

The Claiborne Parish School Board operates Homer Elementary School, Homer Junior High School, and Homer High School.

The Homer area is also served by Claiborne Academy, a privately funded K thru 12 school, that has been serving the Claiborne Parish area since 1970, around the time public high schools were integrated. Many prominent citizens and local civic leaders in Homer and nearby Haynesville, are graduates of Claiborne Academy.

Climate
The climate in this area is characterized by hot, humid summers and generally mild to cool winters.  According to the Köppen Climate Classification system, Homer has a humid subtropical climate, abbreviated "Cfa" on climate maps.

References

External links

Towns in Claiborne Parish, Louisiana
Towns in Louisiana
Parish seats in Louisiana